Lena is an unincorporated community in Morrow County, Oregon, United States. It is on Oregon Route 74. The community was named by C. E. Hinton, who was Lena's first postmaster, and J. S. Vinson. The post office operated from June 11, 1873, to August 31, 1942. Lena is now served by the Heppner post office.

References

Unincorporated communities in Morrow County, Oregon
1873 establishments in Oregon
Populated places established in 1873
Unincorporated communities in Oregon